The 1874 Dissolution Honours List was issued in February 1874 prior to the general election at the advice of the outgoing Prime Minister, William Gladstone.

The recipients of honours are displayed as they were styled before their new honour.

Duke

Hugh Lupus, Marquess of Westminster  by the name, style, and title of Duke of Westminster, in the county of Middlesex

Earl
The Right Honourable John Robert, Viscount Sydney   by the name, style, and title of Earl Sydney, of Scadbury, in the county of Kent

Viscount
The Right Honourable Edward Cardwell, by the name, style, and title of Viscount Cardwell, of Ellerbeck, in the county Palatine of Lancaster

Baron
George Henry Charles Byng, Viscount Enfield, by the style and title of Baron Strafford of Harmondsworth, in the county of Middlesex
The Right Honourable Chichester Samuel Parkinson-Fortescue, by the name, style, and title of Baron Carlingford, of Carlingford, in the county of Louth
The Right Honourable Sir Thomas Francis Fremantle  by the name, style, and title of Baron Cottesloe, of Swanbourne, and of Hardwick, in the county of Buckingham
The Right Honourable Edmund Hammond, by the name, style, and title of Baron Hammond, of Kirkella, in the county of the town of Kingston-upon-Hull

Baronets
Sir Charles Edward Trevelyan    of Grosvenor Crescent, in the parish of Saint George, Hanover Square, in the county of Middlesex
Harry Stephen Thompson, of Kirby Hall, in the parish of Ouseburn Parva, in the West Riding of the county of York
Mathew Wilson, of Eshton Hall, in the parish of Gargrave, in the West Riding of the county of York
Charles Forster, of Lysways, in the parish of Longdon, in the county of Stafford
Thomas Fraser Grove, of Ferne House, in the parish of Donhead Saint Andrew, in the county of Wilts
George Burrows   of Cavendish Square, in the county of Middlesex, and of Springfield, in the Isle of Wight, President of the Royal College of Physicians of London, and one of Her Majesty's Physicians in Ordinary.
Thomas McClure, of Belmont and of Dundela, in the county of Down
John Heathcoat Heathcoat-Amory, of Knightshayes Court, in the parish of Tiverton, in the county of Devon
Richard Green-Price, of Norton Manor, in the parish of Norton, in the county of Radnor
William Miller, of Manderston, in the county of Berwick

References

1874 in the United Kingdom
Dissolution Honours
1874 awards